Purang or Burang, known as Puhreng in Tibetan (IPA: puʂeŋ), is a town which serves as the administrative center of Purang County, Ngari Prefecture of the Tibet Autonomous Region (TAR), China. The town lies at an altitude of 3,900m (12,795 feet) in the valley of the Karnali River. To the south are Gurla Mandhata (Mount Namonanyi) and the Abi Gamin ranges. Lake Manasarovar and Mount Kailash are to the north. This region is the mythological and actual river nexus of the Himalaya with sources of the Indus, Ganges and Yarlung Tsangpo/Brahmaputra all within  of Purang.

Etymology
The Tibetan name of the town (spu hreng) is a corruption of the Zhang-zhung words pu hrang, meaning 'horse head'. Nepalese and Indians call the town Taklakot from Tibetan 'Takla Khar'. Takla Khar means Tiger Hill Castle, which is the name of a historic Zhang-zhung fortress in the county.

Saryu Karnali River's Peacock Mouth source is glaciers  on the northern slopes of the Himalaya  NW of Purang. Lake Manasarovar is just 2 km from few of the Sarayu heads,  and has an ephemeral connection to Rakshastal. The Horse Mouth source of the Yarlung Tsanpo (Brahmaputra) is about 90 km. (55 mi.) SE of Lake Manasarovar.

History and religion
Purang is an ancient trading post. Indian and Nepali communities residing in the mountainous parts of India and Nepal bordering the Purang county have for many generations conducted trade with Tibetan communities at Purang. But the conditions under which this trade presently happens are significantly different from those prevailing before the mid-twentieth century. The government of Nepal issues special border area passes to its citizens who are bona-fide residents of the border district of Humla, which enables them to seek seasonal work in Purang. 

On a cliff above the town was the large ancient fort of Tegla Kar (Lying Tiger Fort) and Simbiling Monastery (both totally destroyed in 1967 by Chinese artillery during the Cultural Revolution, but the monastery has since been partially restored). Beneath them is the Tsegu Gompa or the "Nine-Storey Monastery" which was probably originally a Bön establishment. Tsegu covers many terraces and may be reached by ladders, and contains many unique and ancient wall-painting, darkened from centuries of smoke. It seems that the Tegla kar (Lying Tiger fort) was built during the Zhangzhung dynasty which was conquered by the Tibetan king Songtsen Gampo in the early 7th century CE. It became the main fort of the Purang Kingdom, in the 10th century under King Kori, one of the two sons of Tashi Gon, King of the Guge Kingdom. The Purang kingdom is believed to have ended in the 15th century. In addition, Purang is said to be the place where Sudhana, a previous incarnation of the Buddha, lived.

Purang is the gateway town for travel to Mount Kailash and Lake Manasarovar to the north.  These are important destinations for Bon, Buddhist, Hindu, Jain and even New Age pilgrims.  Traditional cosmology designates Mount Kailash the center of the universe.  Great religious merit is attributed to parikrama around the mountain, and to bathing in Lake Manasarovar.

Administrative divisions 
The town is divided into six village-level divisions:
 Kyitang/Jirang Community
 Toyo/Doyou
 Rikug/Rengong
 Zhidé/Xide
 Khorchak/Kejia, and
 Tridé/Chide
The town's government is seated in the Jirang Neighborhood Committee.

Demographics 
As of 2018, the town has a hukou population of 4,477.

Per the 2010 Chinese Census, the town has a permanent population of 6,047, up from 5,026 in the 2000 Chinese Census.

A 1996 estimate placed the town's population at 4,700.

Transport

Road
National Road S207 begins in Purang, heading NE  past Lake Rakshastal and Manasarovar to China National Highway 219.

Border crossings
Purang is near the borders with India and Nepal. A road leads some  down the Karnali River to the border crossing at the village of Xie'erwa (Tibetan: Sher) into Hilsa in Nepal (Humla District, Karnali Zone) where a historic trail and now a rough motor road continuing to Simikot. There is also a border crossing into India (Pithoragarh district, Uttarakhand State) over Lipulekh Pass.

Geography and climate
Purang has a cold arid climate (Köppen BWk), with long, cold winters and mild summers.

References

Bibliography

External links
 Purang: a region joining Tibet, Nepal, and India (Kailashzone Charitable Foundation)
 Photos of Taklakot

Populated places in Ngari Prefecture
Township-level divisions of Tibet
China–Nepal border crossings